Delegatura may refer to two Polish organizations:

 Delegatura Sił Zbrojnych na Kraj (Armed Forces Delegation for Poland)
 Delegatura Rządu Rzeczypospolitej Polskiej na Kraj (Government Delegation for Poland)